is a 2010 Japanese animated film directed by Noriyuki Abe.  It is the fourth animated film adaptation of the anime and manga series Bleach. In the film, Ichigo Kurosaki and his friends traverse through the world of Hell in order to save his younger sister, Yuzu. The film's theme song is "Save the One, Save the All", performed by T.M.Revolution and its screenplay was written by Natsuko Takahashi and Ookubo Masahiro, with Tite Kubo, author of the manga, overseeing the production.

The film was released in Japanese theatres on December 4, 2010 and in the United States dubbed in November. A prologue for the film, titled Theatre Opening Commemoration! Hell Chapter: Prologue, was included in season 14 of the animation series and included in the regular TV Tokyo schedule, which aired on November 30, 2010. A promotional manga chapter, titled Imaginary Number 01: The Unforgivens, was published showing Shuren confronting Szayel Aporro Granz and Aaroniero Arruruerie in Hell. Additionally, a promotional information book called Bleach: Official Invitation Book The Hell Verse was also released to commemorate the release of Bleach: Hell Verse. The DVD was released on August 25, 2011 in Japan. The English dub was released on DVD and Blu-ray on December 4, 2012 in the United States and on February 24, 2013 in the United Kingdom.

Plot
The film starts with a recap of the anime episodes in which Soul Reaper Ichigo Kurosaki's battle against one of his nemesis, Ulquiorra, and transforms into an incredibly powerful and uncontrollable Hollow. Some time later, Soul Reapers Rukia Kuchiki and Renji Abarai arrive in the human world to inspect a strange occurrence, though they remain vague about what. Shortly after, powerful masked spirits attack Ichigo and his friends at school. When the mask of one of the spirits breaks, the gates of Hell appear and a Kushanāda—one of the guardians of Hell—impales the unmasked spirit, dragging him into Hell. It is revealed that the masked spirits are Sinners and they hide their faces to avoid being dragged back to Hell. During the battle, Ichigo's two sisters, Karin and Yuzu are attacked by Shuren, the leader of the Sinners. Ichigo manages to return in time to attack Shuren, but is unable to defeat him. Kokutō, a Sinner not allied with Shuren, rescues Karin, but Shuren manages to depart with Yuzu. Kokutō offers to assist Ichigo by showing him the route into Hell, and Rukia, Renji, and Uryū Ishida decide to join the quest.

During a fight against Kushanāda, Ichigo's Hollow mask spontaneously manifests. Kokutō explains Hell brings out one's hidden powers and anyone killed in Hell will also get trapped. Kushanāda torture Sinners by consuming them; consumed spirits are eventually reborn at a lower level, after which they are again caught and consumed in a cycle which continues until their will is completely crushed and their remains turn to dust. Confronted by Shuren's minions, Rukia, Renji and Uryū fight while Ichigo and Kokutō move on to Shuren's lair, where Yuzu is held captive. Shuren orders Ichigo to destroy the gates of Hell, believing it will free the Sinners. Once Shuren's group is defeated, Kokutō reveals he tricked Shuren into luring Ichigo to Hell and wants to use Ichigo's Hollow powers to break the invisible chains which tie him to Hell. Kokutō then taunts Ichigo by revealing that Yuzu has become a Sinner, and cutting down Rukia, Uryū and Renji. Ichigo angrily transforms into his Hollow form and blasts Kokutō with a power that destroys most of the chains binding him to Hell and part of the gates of Hell. Renji breaks Ichigo's Hollow mask and activates a spell that teleports Ichigo and Yuzu out of Hell, leaving himself, Rukia and Uryū trapped.

The Soul Reapers arrive at the now-broken gates and begin repairs. Orihime Inoue—a human with healing powers—is brought to heal Yuzu, but even her powers are not enough to undo Hell's bindings. However, Yuzu later spontaneously recovers on her own. Using a Kushanāda attempting to exit the gates as a distraction, Ichigo returns and flies down to the deepest level of Hell, where Rukia has become a Sinner, while Renji and Uryū are rotting away. Ichigo fights Kokutō, while fighting off his Hollow side. Surprisingly, the Kushanāda become a Skull-Clad armor for Ichigo, who explains that Hell itself is asking him for help. Ichigo breaks everyone's chains, saving his friends, while binding Kokutō in more chains that drag him away into the depths of Hell. Despite Rukia's warning, Ichigo discards the armor and they are chased by the Kushanāda again. All four flee back from the finished and repaired gate before it vanishes, where they successfully jump out into the World of the Living and are caught by Orihime's shield, which safely lowers them to the ground.

In the post-credit scene, Yuzu is awake without remembering what happened to her. Relieved, Karin hugs her, ignoring Isshin, who just returned.

Cast

Other media
Light novel adaptation of movie was published on December 6, 2010.

Shuren appears in the PSP video game Bleach: Heat the Soul 7 as a downloadable content playable character, and Kokutō appears in the PS3 video game Bleach: Soul Resurrección as a normal playable character.

Notes

References

External links
  
 
 

2010 anime films
Anime films composed by Shirō Sagisu
Hell Verse
Films directed by Noriyuki Abe
2010s Japanese-language films
Toho animated films
Viz Media anime
Hell in popular culture